The Orenco B was a prototype American fighter aircraft of World War I. It was a single-engined, single-seat biplane that flew in 1918. Although it demonstrated good performance, it did not enter large scale service.

Design and development
The Ordnance Engineering Corporation of Baldwin, Long Island, designed and built its first aircraft, the Type A, a two-seat trainer in 1917, although no production followed. To design its second aircraft, a single-seat fighter, it acquired the services of Frenchman Etienne Dormoy, a member of the French Aeronautical Mission to the United States, who had previously worked for SPAD. The design, the Type B, was a single-engined tractor biplane of wooden construction. It was powered by a single  Gnome Monosoupape 9N rotary engine and had two-bay wings. Planned armament was three Marlin machine guns, one under the upper wing and two under the lower wings.

The first prototype made its maiden flight in early 1918. Despite this, the type was not adopted further, as the 160 hp Gnome did not go into production in the United States, and the US Army decided to build European fighters under license instead. It is uncertain whether all four Type Bs were completed, with some sources indicating only one type B having been built.

Specifications

Notes

Citations

References

1910s United States fighter aircraft
B
Biplanes
Rotary-engined aircraft
Aircraft first flown in 1918
Single-engined tractor aircraft